Imre Kemecsey (born 11 February 1941) is a Hungarian sprint canoeist who competed in 1960s. Competing in two Summer Olympics, he won a silver in the K-1 4 × 500 m event at Rome in 1960.

Kemecsey also won two medals at the 1966 ICF Canoe Sprint World Championships in East Berlin with a silver in the K-1 4 × 500 m and a bronze in the K-1 1000 m events.

References

Sports-reference.com profile

1941 births
Canoeists at the 1960 Summer Olympics
Canoeists at the 1964 Summer Olympics
Hungarian male canoeists
Living people
Olympic canoeists of Hungary
Olympic silver medalists for Hungary
Olympic medalists in canoeing
ICF Canoe Sprint World Championships medalists in kayak
Medalists at the 1960 Summer Olympics
20th-century Hungarian people